Oru Thayin Sabhatham is a 1987 Indian Tamil-language legal drama film written, directed, composed and produced by T. Rajendar. He himself appeared in the lead role with Srividya, whilst the film featured an extensive cast, which also featured Rajendar's son Silambarasan. The film released on 14 April 1987. It is a remake of the 1985 Hindi film Meri Jung.

Plot 
SR is a successful criminal lawyer who consistently wins his cases by manipulating court proceedings to his advantage. In one such case, he conspires with some criminals to frame an innocent man named Thyagarajan for murder, resulting in his death penalty. Thyagarajan's wife, Srividya, and their two children, a son and a daughter, plead with SR, but to no avail. After Thyagarajan's execution, Srividya disappears and is presumed dead.

The two children are adopted by a kind-hearted lawyer and raised as his own. Years later, the son grows up to become Rajkumar, a successful lawyer in his own right. Meanwhile, SR's spoiled son, Madhu, becomes classmates with Rajkumar's sister.

Rajkumar takes on a case defending an innocent doctor, Subhadra, who was framed for murder by SR's associates. Rajkumar wins the case and Subhadra is released, angering SR. Rajkumar befriends Subhadra's husband, Dr. Ravi, who helps him discover that his mother is alive and living in a psychiatric hospital.

Madhu hatches a plan to seduce and betray Rajkumar's sister as revenge against Rajkumar. She falls for Madhu and plans to elope with him, but their classmate Vanitha, who was already betrayed by Madhu, rescues her. Enraged, Madhu kills Vanitha and is framed for her murder. Rajkumar defends Madhu in court and proves him guilty, resulting in a death sentence.

SR plans to kill Rajkumar and his mother, but Srividya, who is revealed to be alive, shoots and kills SR outside the court premises.

Cast 
T. Rajendar as Rajkumar
Srividya as Rajkumar's mother
Jaishankar as Thyagarajan
S. S. Chandran
Nizhalgal Ravi as Dr. Ravi
Charuhasan
Silambarasan (child artist)
Senthamarai as SR
Babloo Prithiveeraj as Madhu
Mekala
Kutty Padmini as Subhadra

Soundtrack 
Soundtrack was composed by T. Rajender who also written lyrics for all songs.
"Raakozhi Koovayile" – S. P. Balasubrahmanyam, Uma Ramanan
"Enathu Ganam Un" – K. J. Yesudas, S. Janaki
"Jadhigal Sollida.. Enathu Ganam Un" – S. P. Balasubrahmanyam
"Ammadiyo Aathadiyo" – S. P. Balasubrahmanyam, Dr. Kalyanam
"Ada Kathalicha Pothathu" – S. P. Balasubrahmanyam
"Sollamathane Intha" – S. P. Balasubrahmanyam, K. S. Chithra
"Saaral Kaathuladhan" – S. P. Balasubrahmanyam, Uma Ramanan
"Magane Nee Uranga" – Vidya
"Dharmanthan Jeyikkumunga" – Malaysia Vasudevan, Vidya
"Pottane Moonu Muducchithan" – S. P. Balasubrahmanyam, B. S. Sasirekha

Release and reception 
Oru Thayin Sabatham was released on 14 April 1987. According to an article by Sreedhar Pillai in India Today, the film was "sold for Rs 50 lakh" and it did business "worth over Rs 80 lakh". The Indian Express wrote, "Rajendar is a talented man, but he should bridle his overbearing ambitions. He should learn to serve the ends of cinema with humility." Kalki criticised the climactic fight sequence as a waste of budget, as well as S. S. Chandran's comedy.

References

External links 
 

1980s legal drama films
1980s Tamil-language films
1987 films
Films about miscarriage of justice
Films directed by T. Rajendar
Films scored by T. Rajendar
Films with screenplays by T. Rajendar
Indian legal drama films
Tamil remakes of Hindi films